Darreh Tang (also known as Deh Kalleh) is a village in Silakhor Rural District, Silakhor District, Dorud County, Lorestan Province, Iran. At the 2006 census, its population was 195, in 46 families.

References 

Towns and villages in Dorud County